Nukutavake Airport  is an airport serving the village of Tavananui, located on the Nukutavake island, in the Tuamotu group of atolls in French Polynesia,  from Tahiti.

The airport was inaugurated in 1981.

Airlines and destinations

Passenger
No scheduled flights as of May 2019.

Statistics

References

 Pictures
 History

External links
 Atoll list (in French)
 Classification of the French Polynesian atolls by Salvat (1985)

Airports in French Polynesia
Atolls of the Tuamotus